Maxime Bastian (born 9 May 2001) is a French professional footballer who plays as a left-back for Annecy, on loan from Strasbourg.

Career
A youth product of Strasbourg since the U11s, he began his senior career with their reserves in 2018. He signed his first professional contract with the club in May 2021. On 24 June 2021, he joined Annecy on loan for the 2021–22 season in the Championnat National. He helped Annecy come in second in the league, earning promotion into the Ligue 2. His loan was extended with Annecy for the 2022–23 season, and he also extended his agreement with his parent club Strasbourg until 2025.

References

External links
 
 Ligue 1 profile

2001 births
Living people
People from Saverne
French footballers
RC Strasbourg Alsace players
FC Annecy players
Ligue 2 players
Championnat National players
Championnat National 3 players
Association football fullbacks